Mink Lake is located in Grand Teton National Park, in the U. S. state of Wyoming.

References

Lakes of Grand Teton National Park